Thomas Tanner may refer to:

Thomas Tanner (bishop) (1674–1735), English antiquary and prelate
Thomas Tanner (writer) (1630–1682), English clergyman and writer
Thomas Hawkes Tanner (1824–1871), English physician
Thomas Tanner (New Zealand politician) (1830–1918), New Zealand politician
Thomas Tanner (MP) (died 1401), MP for Wells